Lasiognathus amphirhamphus is a species of wolftrap angler found in the Madeira Abyssal Plain in the east-central Atlantic Ocean where it occurs at a depth of from .  The females of this species grow to a length of  SL.  This species is characterized by having only two (as opposed to three) bony hooks on its esca, which are lightly pigmented. The distal escal appendage is elongated and cylindrical with a long, compressed prolongation at the tip as in L. saccostoma. The prolongation has six tiny filaments at the tip and no lateral serrations. The posterior escal appendage is broad and laterally compressed. Its species name is from the Greek for "double hook", referring to its escal hooks.

References

External links

 

Thaumatichthyidae
Taxa named by Theodore Wells Pietsch III
Fish described in 2005